Tessaropa carioca is a species of beetle in the family Cerambycidae. It was found in Brazil, and described by Ubirajara Ribeiro Martins in 1981.

References

Methiini
Beetles described in 1981
Beetles of South America